is the 29th President of the University of Tokyo in Tokyo, Japan. He was born in Akashi in Hyōgo Prefecture, graduated from Nada High School and is the first University of Tokyo President to be born after World War II. He is also a Professor of Law, specializing in media law, constitutional law, the freedom of speech, and human rights law. He earned his Bachelor's, Master's, and Doctorate degrees from the University of Tokyo. His hobby is mountain climbing.

References

University of Tokyo alumni
Presidents of the University of Tokyo
Living people
1950 births
People from Akashi, Hyōgo